Rajnagar Union is an Union Parishad under Rampal Upazila of Bagerhat District in the division of Khulna, Bangladesh. It has an area of 78.17 km2 (30.18 sq mi) and a population of 13,593.

Villages 
 Kalekharber
 Rajnagar
 Kalikaproshad
 Bujbunia
 Bara durgapur
 Choto Durgapur
 Gona Belai
 Chalkgona
 Shapmari Katakhali

References

Unions of Rampal Upazila
Unions of Bagerhat District
Unions of Khulna Division